Verkhny Karachan is a rural locality (a selo) and the administrative center of Verkhnekarachanskoye Rural Settlement, Gribanovsky  District, Voronezh Oblast, Russia. In the 19th century the village was part of Verkhnekarachanskaya volost, Novokhopyorsky Uyezd, Voronezh Governorate. The population was 1,977 as of 2010. There are 29 streets.

Geography 
Verkhny Karachan is located 17 km west of Gribanovsky (the district's administrative centre) by road. Sredny Karachan is the nearest rural locality.

References 

Rural localities in Gribanovsky District
Novokhopyorsky Uyezd